Tomás Cardona Bernaschina (born 10 October 1995) is an Argentine professional footballer who plays as a centre-back for Defensa y Justicia.

Club career
Born in Buenos Aires, Cardona was a San Lorenzo youth graduate. He made his first team debut on 21 May 2015, starting and scoring his team's third in a 3–0 Copa Argentina home win against Viale FC María Grande.

On 20 January 2016, Cardona was loaned to fellow Primera División side Defensa y Justicia for six months. He made his top tier debut on 7 February by playing the last 26 minutes in a 2–2 home draw against Unión de Santa Fe, and scored his first goal in the category on 4 March by netting the opener in a 5–1 away routing of Argentinos Juniors.

Cardona's loan was later extended for the 2016–17 season, and he later signed for Godoy Cruz on 24 July 2017. He later became a regular starter at the club.

Cardona moved abroad on 27 August 2020, after agreeing to a one-year loan deal with Spanish Segunda División side UD Las Palmas.

On 6 July 2021, Cardona joined Defensa y Justicia on a deal until the end of 2024.

References

External links
 
 
 

1995 births
Living people
Footballers from Buenos Aires
Argentine footballers
Argentine expatriate footballers
Association football defenders
Argentine Primera División players
San Lorenzo de Almagro footballers
Defensa y Justicia footballers
Godoy Cruz Antonio Tomba footballers
Segunda División players
UD Las Palmas players
Argentine expatriate sportspeople in Spain
Expatriate footballers in Spain